Imanabad (also Romanized as Īmānābād) is a village in Azna Rural District, in the Central District of Khorramabad County, Lorestan Province, Iran. At the 2006 census, its population was 1,282, in 228 families.

References 

Towns and villages in Khorramabad County